Macrocephenchelys brachialis is an eel in the family Congridae (conger/garden eels). It was described by Henry Weed Fowler in 1934. It is a marine, deep water-dwelling eel which is known from two specimens collected in the Macassar Strait, in the western central Pacific Ocean.

References

Congridae
Fish described in 1934